Tarauni is a Local Government Area in Kano State, Nigeria. Its Secretariat is in the locality of Unguwa Uku within the city of Kano.

It has an area of 28 km and a population of 221,367 at the 2006 census.

The postal code of the area is 700.

The Local Government has ten (10) Wards as follows,

Tarauni Ward
Gyadi-Gyadi Arewa Ward
Gyadi-Gyadi Kudu Ward
Darmawa Ward
Daurawa Ward
Babban Giji Ward
Hotoro Ward
Unguwa Uku Cikin Gari Ward, 
Unguwa Uku Kauyen Alu Ward
Unguwar Gano Ward

Each ward has its own representative as councilor.

Notable Clans
Jobawa

Notable Dynasties

Notable Personalities
 Dalhatu Bayero
 Musa Gwadabe
 Mustapha Dangi
 Abdullahi Aliyu Sumaila
 Alhaji Jibir Wudil
 Bello Maitama Yusuf
 Justice Sanusi Ado Ma'aji
 Sa'ad Asad Mohammed
 Senator Isa Kachako
Lawan Musa Abdullahi
 Garba Imam
 Musa Magami
 Isa Gambo Dutse
 Senator Ahmed Zakari
 Ado Gwaram
 Arch Ibrahim Haruna
Engr Mamman Abdullahi Umar
Barrister Aliyu Umar
Alhaji Bagudu Birnin Kebbi
Alh Nura Alkassim Gulu

References

Local Government Areas in Kano State